The 1966 All-SEC football team consists of American football players selected to the All-Southeastern Conference (SEC) chosen by various selectors for the 1966 NCAA University Division football season.

Offensive selections

Receivers 

 Ray Perkins, Alabama (AP-1, UPI)
 Richard Trapp, Florida (AP-1, UPI)
 Austin Denney, Tennessee (AP-2, UPI)
 Johnny Mills, Tennessee (AP-1)
 Freddie Hyat, Auburn (AP-2)
Wayne Cook, Alabama (AP-2)

Tackles 

 Cecil Dowdy, Alabama (AP-1, UPI)
 Edgar Chandler, Georgia (AP-1, UPI)
 Jerry Duncan, Alabama (AP-2)
 Bubba Hampton, Miss. St. (AP-2)

Guards 
Jim Benson, Florida (AP-2, UPI)
Bob Johnson, Tennessee (AP-1)
Don Hayes, Georgia (AP-1)
Johnny Calvert, Alabama (UPI)
Scott Hall, Vanderbilt (AP-2)

Centers 
 Bill Carr, Florida (AP-1, UPI)
 Charles Hinton, Ole Miss (AP-2)

Quarterbacks 

 Steve Spurrier, Florida (College Football Hall of Fame)  (AP-1, UPI)
 Dewey Warren, Tennessee (AP-2)

Running backs 

 Larry Smith, Florida (AP-1, UPI)
Ronnie Jenkins, Georgia (AP-2, UPI)
Doug Cuningham, Ole Miss (AP-1)
Charlie Fulton, Tennessee (AP-2)

Defensive selections

Ends 
Jerry Richardson, Ole Miss (AP-2, UPI)
John Garlington, LSU (AP-1)
Larry Kohn, Georgia (AP-1)
Mike Robichaux, LSU (UPI)
Jeff Van Note, Kentucky (AP-2)

Tackles 
 George Patton, Georgia (AP-1, UPI)
 Jim Urbanek, Ole Miss(AP-1, UPI)

Middle guards 

 Jimmy Keyes, Ole Miss (AP-1)
 Gusty Yearout, Auburn (UPI)
Bobby Morel, Tennessee (AP-2)

Linebackers 
 Paul Naumoff, Tennessee (AP-1, UPI)
 D. D. Lewis, Miss. St. (College Football Hall of Fame)  (AP-1, UPI)
 Chip Healy, Vanderbilt (AP-2, UPI)
 George Bevan, LSU (AP-1)
Gusty Yearout, Auburn (AP-2)
Doug Archibald, Tennessee (AP-2)

Backs 
Lynn Hughes, Georgia (AP-1, UPI)
 Bobby Johns, Alabama (AP-1, UPI)
 Gerald Warfield, Ole Miss (AP-1)
 Dicky Thompson, Alabama (UPI)
Dicky Lyons, Kentucky (AP-2)
Jerry Davis, Kentucky (AP-2)
Sammy Grezaffi, LSU (AP-2)

Special teams

Kicker 

 Bobby Etter, Georgia (AP)

Punter 

 Tommy Lanceford, Auburn (AP)

Key 
AP = Associated Press

UPI = United Press International

Bold = Consensus first-team selection by both AP and UPI

See also
1966 College Football All-America Team

References

All-SEC
All-SEC football teams